Hsieh Pei-hua (born 9 May 1985) is a Taiwanese diver. She competed in the women's 10 metre platform event at the 2000 Summer Olympics.

References

1985 births
Living people
Taiwanese female divers
Olympic divers of Taiwan
Divers at the 2000 Summer Olympics
Place of birth missing (living people)
Divers at the 2002 Asian Games
Asian Games competitors for Chinese Taipei